Kentucky Route 1683 (KY 1683) was a former state highway that ran from Clays Mill Road to US 27 (Nicholasville Road) in Lexington, Kentucky. Its former routing was from the entrance of Jessie M. Clark Middle School and followed along what is now Vincent Way to West Reynolds Road. In 1999, a new four-lane urban arterial opened from Clays Mill to the Norfolk Southern Railway underpass; this included a new traffic circle with Keithshire Way, the first in the city. Part of the old West Reynolds Road was renamed Vincent Way.

History 
Ownership transferred from the Kentucky Transportation Cabinet to the city of Lexington on June 9, 1999.

Major intersections

See also 
 Roads of Lexington, Kentucky

References 

1683
1683